Emanuel J. Parris (born October 7, 1982) is a Canadian former athlete who competed as a sprinter.

Parris, born in Etobicoke, Ontario, was a collegiate athlete for the Université de Sherbrooke and represented Canada at the 2005 Summer Universiade. In 2006 he was a member of Canada's 4 × 100 metres relay team which won a bronze medal at the Commonwealth Games in Melbourne, running the final leg. He travelled to the 2008 Summer Olympics in Beijing as a reserve for the 4 × 100 metres relay.

References

External links
Emanuel Parris at World Athletics

1982 births
Living people
Canadian male sprinters
Sportspeople from Etobicoke
Commonwealth Games bronze medallists for Canada
Commonwealth Games medallists in athletics
Medallists at the 2006 Commonwealth Games
Athletes (track and field) at the 2006 Commonwealth Games
Competitors at the 2005 Summer Universiade